The Oquawka Wagon Bridge is a covered bridge located  south of Oquawka in Henderson County, Illinois. The wooden bridge was built in 1866, replacing an earlier bridge called the Eames Bridge; the bridge structure cost $2,125, while its stone abutments cost $2.40 per perch. The bridge carried a road over Henderson Creek until 1935, when the state government moved the roadway; in the following year, the bridge became a pedestrian bridge, and the state opened a picnic area in its vicinity. The bridge was added to the National Register of Historic Places in 1975.

See also
List of covered bridges in Illinois

References

Covered bridges on the National Register of Historic Places in Illinois
Bridges completed in 1866
Buildings and structures in Henderson County, Illinois
1866 establishments in Illinois
National Register of Historic Places in Henderson County, Illinois
Road bridges on the National Register of Historic Places in Illinois
Wooden bridges in Illinois
Burr Truss bridges in the United States